Tuulikki Jahre (born 11 August 1951) is a Swedish former cyclist. She competed in the women's road race event at the 1984 Summer Olympics.

References

External links
 

1951 births
Living people
Swedish female cyclists
Olympic cyclists of Sweden
Cyclists at the 1984 Summer Olympics
People from Lieksa